HMS H26 was a British H class submarine built by Vickers Limited, Barrow-in-Furness, as part of the Batch 3 H class submarines. She was launched on 15 November 1917 and was commissioned on 29 December 1918. It had a complement of twenty-two crew members.

HMS H26 was sold on 30 August 1935 in Newport.

Design

H26 was fitted with an anti-aircraft gun and four  torpedo tubes. Its torpedo tubes were fitted to the bows and the submarine was loaded with eight  torpedoes. It is a Holland 602 type submarine but was designed to meet Royal Navy specifications. Its complement was twenty-two crew members.

References

Bibliography
 

 

British H-class submarines
Ships built in Barrow-in-Furness
1917 ships
World War I submarines of the United Kingdom
Royal Navy ship names